Charles Ernest Bunnell (January 12, 1878 – November 1, 1956) was a district judge for the United States Fourth Judicial Division and the University of Alaska's first president, from 1921 to 1949. He ran for Alaska Territorial Delegate to Congress on the Democratic Party ticket in 1914, but was defeated. He was appointed to his district judgeship January 15, 1915 by US President Woodrow Wilson, serving as judge on the US District Court in Fairbanks, Alaska for seven years.

On August 11, 1921 Bunnell was appointed the president of the newly created Alaska Agricultural College and School of Mines, which later became the University of Alaska. He served in this capacity for 27 years, through a great amount of expansion, and the Alaska constitutional convention.

The Bunnell Building, built in 1960 on the University of Alaska Fairbanks campus, is named after him. The first presidential residence, built in 1921, was replaced by the current chancellor's residence in 1954. The original structure was moved in 1958, becoming the Bunnell House Early Childhood Lab School. A statue was constructed of Bunnell in Cornerstone Plaza, in the center of campus.

References
Farthest North College President: Charles E. Bunnell and the Early History of the University of Alaska. 1972. William R. Cashen. University of Alaska Press: Fairbanks.
"Founding President Charles E. Bunnell".
"New Bunnell Building Will Honor First University of Alaska President".

Notes

External links
 

1878 births
1956 deaths
Alaska Democrats
Alaska Territory judges
20th-century American judges
American Episcopalians
Bucknell University alumni
Leaders of the University of Alaska Fairbanks